Jennifer Bradley is an American politician who has served as a Republican member of the Florida Senate since 2020. She represents the 5th district, encompassing Baker, Bradford, Clay, Columbia, Dixie, Gilchrist, Lafayette, Levy, Suwannee, Union, part of Marion Counties.

Electoral history

2020 State Senate Election

References

External links
Florida State Senator - Jennifer Bradley

21st-century American politicians
Year of birth missing (living people)
Living people
Republican Party Florida state senators
21st-century American women politicians
Women state legislators in Florida
University of Florida alumni
Florida State University alumni